Robert William Mountford (23 February 1952 – 26 August 2008) was an English footballer who played 277 matches in the Football League for various clubs, scoring 64 goals.

He made his debut for Port Vale in April 1969, and became a first team regular after signing professional forms in February 1970. He was loaned out to Scunthorpe United and Crewe Alexandra in 1974, before he joined Rochdale for £2,000 in December of that year. He scored 41 goals in 117 league and cup games, before moving on to Huddersfield Town in 1977. He switched to Halifax Town the following year, before joining Stockport County via Crewe Alexandra in 1980. He emigrated to Australia the following year, and played and coached at numerous teams, including Newcastle KB United, Brisbane City FC, and Adamstown Rosebud. He became a prison warder at Cessnock Correctional Centre in 1988.

Playing career
As a youth he played for local village team Brown Edge, before being spotted by Stanley Matthews and persuaded to join Port Vale juniors. He graduated through the Vale youth set up to make his first team debut as a substitute in a 2–0 defeat at Doncaster Rovers on 19 April 1969. Signing professional forms under Gordon Lee in February 1970, he made his full debut in a 2–0 defeat by Shrewsbury Town at Vale Park in a League Cup first round match on 18 August 1971. The young striker was gradually broken into the team over the 1971–72 and 1972–73 seasons.

He was a regular in the 1973–74 side that battled against relegation from the Third Division. The following season saw the Vale push for promotion under Roy Sproson's stewardship, with Ray Williams, Brian Horton and new signing Terry Bailey providing 41 goals between them. Unable to establish himself in the new set-up, Mountford joined Fourth Division strugglers Scunthorpe United on a one-month loan in October 1974. That December he joined Crewe Alexandra, another side failing to find the net. He made five appearances for the "Alex" before being sold to Walter Joyce's Rochdale for £2,000 later in the month.

The "big, bustling, old fashioned, centre forward" was in his element at Spotland. The 1975–76 and 1976–77 seasons were spent in mid-table obscurity in the basement division, but with 41 goals in 117 games, Mountford was a sensation for the club.

He moved on to Huddersfield Town in September 1977 for £10,000, but struggled with injuries at Leeds Road. The 1977–78 season saw the "Terriers" performing comfortably in the Fourth Division under Tom Johnston's stewardship, but Rochdale clearly missed Mountford's goals – they finished bottom with 24 points and 43 goals scored.

In 1978, he joined George Kirby's Halifax Town, another club at the foot of the Football League. The 1978–79 and 1979–80 seasons were difficult, Mountford bagging eleven goals from 62 league games.

In 1980, he joined Tony Waddington's Crewe Alexandra on a permanent basis, but played just three games before joining Stockport County later in the year. He scored three goals in nine league games for Jimmy McGuigan's "Hatters" during the 1980–81 season.

Coaching career
After leaving Stockport, Mountford emigrated to Australia, playing for Newcastle KB United, also serving as their assistant coach. After a spell with Brisbane City FC and Blacktown he was appointed assistant coach and youth coach at Newcastle Breakers. He later coached Azzuri, Newcastle-Port Stephens juniors and Edgeworth under 19s. In April 2007 he took charge at Adamstown Rosebud and was still at the helm at the time of his death.

He joined the Prison Service in 1988, whilst still coaching, becoming a warden at Cessnock Correctional Centre in Cessnock, New South Wales.

Mountford died on 26 August 2008 in Australia, following a lengthy battle against cancer. He was survived by his wife and their two children; Paul and Anna.

Career statistics
Source:

References

1952 births
2008 deaths
English footballers
Footballers from Stoke-on-Trent
Association football forwards
Port Vale F.C. players
Scunthorpe United F.C. players
Crewe Alexandra F.C. players
Rochdale A.F.C. players
Huddersfield Town A.F.C. players
Halifax Town A.F.C. players
Stockport County F.C. players
Newcastle KB United players
Brisbane City FC players
Blacktown City FC players
English Football League players
National Soccer League (Australia) players
Association football coaches
English football managers
English expatriate footballers
Expatriate soccer players in Australia
Deaths from colorectal cancer
Deaths from cancer in New South Wales